The Madrid International Auto Show (Salón Internacional del Automóvil de Madrid in Spanish) is a motor show held biennially (on even years) in May at Feria de Madrid, Spain, which alternates with the Barcelona Motor Show.  It is not recognized as a major international show by the Organisation Internationale des Constructeurs d'Automobiles.

2012
Running from 25 May to 3 June, the 2012 show only attracted eight marques to formally display their models.

2010
The 2010 show opened 20 May. It included the display of the new Tesla Model S. SEAT displayed their IBE concept car, which had been previously shown at the Geneva Motor Show.

2006
The 2006 show ran from 26 May to 4 June.

Introductions:
 Citroën C-Buggy concept
 Citroën Jumper minivan
 Citroën C-Triomphe (2008 C4 sedan preview)
 Kia Carens
 Toyota Avensis facelift

2008 
Alternative propulsion prototypes:
 Citroën C-Cactus
 Nissan Denki Cube
 Volvo C30 ReCharge

References

External links 
 

Auto shows in Spain
Road transport in Spain
Transport in Madrid
Culture in Madrid
Spring (season) events in Spain